The Ministry of Public Works, Transportation and Communications is a ministry of the Government of Haiti. This ministry is responsible for Public Works, Transportation and Communications as part of the Prime Minister's Cabinet.

See also
 

Government ministries of Haiti